Phaeoura kirkwoodi is a species of geometrid moth in the family Geometridae. It is found in North America.

The MONA or Hodges number for Phaeoura kirkwoodi is 6765.

References

Further reading

 

Nacophorini
Articles created by Qbugbot
Moths described in 1961